Alswear is a village in Devon, England, approximately  northwest of Exeter.

References

External links

Villages in Devon